The Doncaster Baseball Club, also known as the Doncaster Dragons is a baseball club based in Doncaster, Victoria and is the third largest club in Australia.

The Dragons currently field 5 senior teams, 2 Women's teams and 6 junior teams in the Baseball Victoria Summer League.

In winter the Dragons field 4 Senior Men's teams and 4 Junior teams in the Melbourne Winter Baseball League

History
The Doncaster Dragons Baseball Club was formed in 1974 with the merger of the Doncaster United Baseball Club and the former Doncaster Baseball Club. The Doncaster United Baseball Club was formed itself from the amalgamation of the Box Hill Baseball Club and Donvale Baseball Club some years prior.

The club's first president was the late Charles Chasemore, he led the club from 1974 to 1976.

On 9 December 2008 it was named Club of the Year by the Australian Baseball Federation.

Premierships

Summer

Winter

Titles in italics refer to reserves grade

Women's

Titles in italics refer to reserves grade

See also
 Baseball Victoria

References

External links
Official website

1964 establishments in Australia
Baseball teams established in 1964
Sports clubs established in 1964
Australian baseball clubs
Women's baseball teams in Australia
Sport in the City of Manningham